Tori Amos: The Complete Videos 1991–1998 is a VHS cassette of all of Tori Amos's videos from Little Earthquakes through From the Choirgirl Hotel, with the exception of Professional Widow. The video collection was released in a standard-size hard plastic VHS case and a large soft plastic VHS case (with the same catalogue number). The video collection runs approximately 75 minutes and was released by Atlantic Records
. 

Tori Amos: The Complete Videos 1991–1998 was RIAA certified Gold in March 1999 
.

Track listing

References

Tori Amos video albums
1998 video albums
Music video compilation albums
1998 compilation albums